The Victims Bill was one of the new laws proposed at the 2021 State Opening of Parliament in the United Kingdom. It is intended to prevent domestic violence.

References 

Proposed laws of the United Kingdom
Family in the United Kingdom
Violence in the United Kingdom
Women's rights in the United Kingdom